Johan Jackson (born 24 January 1987) is a South African rugby union footballer.   He plays either as an outside-centre or a winger. He represents the Pumas in the Currie Cup and Vodacom Cup, having previously played for the Blue Bulls, Valke and Golden Lions.

References

External links 

itsrugby.co.uk profile

Living people
1987 births
South African rugby union players
Rugby union centres
People from Rustenburg
South African people of British descent
White South African people
Blue Bulls players
Golden Lions players
Pumas (Currie Cup) players
Rugby union players from North West (South African province)